An exchange fund or swap fund is a mechanism specific to the U.S., first introduced in the late 1960s, that allows holders of a large amount of a single stock to diversify into a basket of other stocks without directly selling their stock.

The purpose of this arrangement is to diversify their holdings without triggering a "taxable event".  Note that the tax is not avoided, just postponed; when the diversified holdings are eventually sold, tax will be due on the difference between the sales price and the original cost basis of the contributed stock.

Criticism
The U.S. Securities and Exchange Commission  has investigated the use of these arrangements with reference to the potential for market abuse by directors not disclosing their effective divestment in stocks for which they are privy to sensitive market information.

In addition, there is general criticism that tax revenue that might otherwise have been generated is avoided.  Many holders of these positions may elect to hold the concentrated position and borrow against it rather than sell and pay the associated capital gains tax.

Providers
There are exchange funds for publicly held stock and private stock (pre-IPO). Eaton Vance is the largest of the public stock exchange fund providers and many of the large brokerage houses such as Goldman Sachs, Morgan Stanley etc. have exchange funds as well. Startup Exchange Fund and EB Exchange are the best known companies that specialize in exchange funds for privately held equity (stock of private companies).

Detailed structure
 Fund holding requirements: The fund needs to have at least 20% of its assets in "non-publicly traded" securities or real-estate.
 Exchange funds have many cons, including asymmetric information risk, agency risk, liquidity risk, etc. 
 For public exchange funds, at least seven years have to elapse between when an investor deposits their stock and when the basket of stocks is available for them to sell without realizing a step up in basis (paying taxes). However, this is not an issue with private stock exchange funds as the point is diversification, not tax deferral.
 Liquidity: Public funds are generally not marginable. Private funds increase a participant's odds of liquidity.

Public vs. private equity exchange funds
Private equity exchange funds (those comprising stock in non-public companies) differ from public exchange funds in a few regards:
 A main objective of private equity exchange funds is providing participants with downside risk protection, in case their own stock becomes worthless before they achieve a liquidity event (an IPO or acquisition.)  The need for diversification is much more heightened than it is with public stock which may be sold at any time, if the holder wishes to bear the tax consequences.
 When liquidity events occur within a private equity fund, proceeds are immediately distributed to limited partners, rather than being held or reinvested. The objective of these funds is liquidity as well as diversification.
 Fund management fees are assessed on the basis of an expense budget, rather than a percent of the value, since valuation of the private equity holdings is uncertain.

References

Investment